The 2016 BWF International Series was the tenth season of the BWF International Series.

Schedule
Below is the schedule released by Badminton World Federation:

Tournaments Cancel

Results

Winners

Performance by countries

Tabulated below are the International Series based on countries. Only countries who have won a title are listed:

References

BWF International Series
BWF International Series